Henderson Township is the name of some places in the U.S. state of Pennsylvania:

Henderson Township, Huntingdon County, Pennsylvania
Henderson Township, Jefferson County, Pennsylvania

Pennsylvania township disambiguation pages